Remzi Aydın Jöntürk (September 15, 1936 – September 2, 1987) was a Turkish filmmaker, actor, screenwriter, and producer. He directed more than 72 feature films in his long career.

Jöntürk is credited for creating and directing some of the most famous examples of the Turkish psychedelic cinema including Yarinsiz Adam (The Man without Tomorrow) and Yıkılmayan Adam (The Indestructible Man), both starring Cüneyt Arkın as part of his psychedelic socio-political action The Adam Trilogy. He is considered one of the most prominent psychedelic-action film makers of 1970's Turkish cinema during its boom period.

Life 
Son of Ibrahim Aydin who was a military officer, Jöntürk was born September 15, 1936 in Erzincan, Turkey where his father was appointed as central government representative. He studied at the prestigious Kuleli Military High School, and then at Istanbul Institute of Journalism and Academy of Fine Arts.  Jöntürk entered into cinema in the 1960s starting out as a set designer in Yesilcam. While an assistant director to Sureyya Duru, in 1964, he directed his first film Zımba Gibi Delikanlı starring Palme d'Or winner Yılmaz Güney. He died September 2, 1987 at age 50 in a traffic accident in Çanakkale, Turkey, just 13 days shy of his 51st birthday.

Banning of Zindan in Germany

Zindan (Prison) a 1974 action film directed by Jöntürk, was banned in Germany in 1988. Although, currently ban is not in effect, Zindan remains to be the only Turkish movie title ever been banned in Germany due to gore, violence and cruelty it contains.

Filmography
Films as actor (5 films)

 Malkoçoğlu Kara Korsan 1968
 Aslan Bey  1968
 Malkoçoğlu Krallara Karşı  1967
 Başlık  1965
 Kamalı Zeybek  1964

Films as director (72 films)

 Afrodit (Aphrodite) 1987
 Yaralı Can (Wounded Hearth) 1987
 Kucuk Prens (VerbatimTurkish adoptation of Saint-Exupéry's The Little Prince)
 Biraz Neşe Biraz Keder (Sometimes happiness, sometimes sadness) 1986
 Domdom Kurşunu (Buckshot) 1985
 Eroin Hattı (Heroine Connection) 1985
 Altar 1985
 Geçim Otobüsü (Election Bus) 1984
 Halk Düşmanı (Enemy of State) 1984
 Beş Kafadar (Five Friends) 1984
 İkimiz De Sevdik (We Both Fell in Love) 1983
 Can Kurban (I'd give my life) 1983
 Nikah (Wedding) 1983
 Aşk Adası (Island of Love) 1983
 Türkiyem 1983
 Bir Pazar Günü (On a Sunday) 1982
 Ağlayan Gülmedi mi? (Those Who Cry Also Laughs) 1982
 Milcan 1981
 Öğretmen Kemal (Kemal the Teacher) 1981
 Acı Gerçekler (Painful Truth) 1981
 Takip (Chase) 1981
 Unutulmayanlar (Unforgettables) 1981
 Çile (Heartache)1980
 Çile Tarlası (Field of Heartaches) 1980
 Destan (Legend) 1980
 Kara Yazma (Black Scarf) 1979
 Hayat Harcadın Beni (Wasted by the Life)1979
 Uyanış (Awakening) 1978
 Kaplanlar Ağlamaz (Tigers don't Cry)1978
 Lekeli Melek (Stained Angel)1978
 Avare (Vagabon) 1978
 Kan (Blood) 1977
 Yıkılmayan Adam (Indestructible Man) 1977
 Satılmış Adam (Sold Man) 1977
 Şeref Yumruğu (Fist of Honor) 1977
 Hırçın Kız (Wild Girl) 1977
 Yarınsız Adam (Man without Tomorrow) 1976
 Ölüme Yalnız Gidilir (Lone Voyage to Death) 1976
 Silahlara Veda (Farewell to Arms) 1976
 Tepedeki Ev (House on the Hill) 1976
 Hora Geliyor Hora (Here comes Hora)1976
 Bir Defa Yetmez (Never Enough)1975
 İsyan (Mutiny) 1975
 Macera (Adventure) 1975
 Yarınlar Bizim (Tomorrows are Ours) 1975
 Kahramanlar (Heroes) 1974
 Zindan (Prison) 1974
 Sayılı Kabadayılar 1974
 Göç (Migration) 1974
 Duvak 1973
 Pir Sultan Abdal 1973
 Arap Abdo (Abdo the Arab)1973
 Elif İle Seydo (Elif and Seydo)1972
 İntikam Kartalları ( Eagles of Revenge) 1971
 Hasret 1971
 Kader Bağlayınca (When Destiny Bounds) 1970
 Sevgili Muhafızım (My Beloved Bodyguard)1970
 Avare (Vagabond) 1970
 Yaralı Kalp (Wounded Hearth)1969
 Malkoçoğlu Cem Sultan 1969
 Malkoçoğlu Kara Korsan (Black Pirate) 1968
 Cango Ölüm Süvarisi (aka Korkusuz Adam) (Django, the Fighter of Death)1967
 Malkoçoğlu Krallara Karşı 1967
 Bir Şoförün Gizli Defteri (Secret Dairy of a Chauffeur 1967
 Eşkiya Celladı (Executioner of Bandits)1967
 At Hırsızı Banuş ( Banush the Horse Thief)1967
 Ve Silahlara Veda (And Farewell to Arms)1966
 Yaşamak Haram Oldu (Living has become a Sin)1966
 Göklerdeki Sevgili (My Love in the Sky) 1966
 Zorlu Düşman (Though Enemy) 1966
 Beyaz Atlı Adam (The Man with White Horse) 1965
 Mağrur Ve Sefil (Victim and Poor) 1965
 Zımba Gibi Delikanlı (Straight Guy)1964

Films as producer(5 films)

 Altar 1985
 Domdom Kurşunu 1985
 Halk Düşmanı 1984
 Elif İle Seydo 1972
 İntikam Kartalları 1971

Films as scriptwriter (44 films)

 Domdom Kurşunu 1985
 Eroin Hattı 1985
 Beş Kafadar 1984
 Geçim Otobüsü 1984
 İkimiz De Sevdik 1983
 Aşk Adası 1983
 Bir Pazar Günü 1982
 Acı Gerçekler 1981
 Azap Çiçeği 1981
 Milcan 1981
 Unutulmayanlar 1981
 Sevgi Dünyası 1980
 Avare 1978
 Kaplanlar Ağlamaz 1978
 Hayata Dönüş 1977
 Hırçın Kız 1977
 Hora Geliyor Hora 1976
 Ölüme Yalnız Gidilir 1976
 Silahlara Veda 1976
 Bir Defa Yetmez 1975
 İsyan 1975
 Macera 1975
 Kahramanlar 1974
 Sayılı Kabadayılar 1974
 Zindan 1974
 Göç 1974
 Duvak 1973
 Elif İle Seydo 1972
 Malkoçoğlu Ölüm Fedaileri 1971
 Hasret 1971
 İntikam Kartalları 1971
 Melikşah 1969
 Malkoçoğlu Akıncılar Geliyor 1969
 Yaralı Kalp 1969
 Malkoçoğlu Cem Sultan 1969
 Yakılacak Kitap 1968
 Bir Şoförün Gizli Defteri 1967
 Bir Şoförün Gizli Defteri 1967
 Eşkiya Celladı 1967
 Yaşamak Haram Oldu 1966
 Göklerdeki Sevgili 1966
 Ve Silahlara Veda 1966
 Beyaz Atlı Adam 1965
 Zımba Gibi Delikanlı 1964

Films as book author (1 film)
 Kader 1968

Films as assistant director (1 film)
 Şoför Nebahat Ve Kızı

References

External links

Official Remzi Jöntürk Website

1936 births
1987 deaths
Turkish male film actors
Turkish film directors
Turkish film producers
Turkish male screenwriters
20th-century Turkish male actors
Road incident deaths in Turkey
Burials at Feriköy Cemetery
20th-century screenwriters